Tom Waldman (July 8, 1922 – July 23, 1985) was an American screenwriter whose credits included Inspector Clouseau, Trail of the Pink Panther and The Party, both in collaboration with Blake Edwards, and episodes of popular TV series such as McHale's Navy, I Dream of Jeannie, Gilligan's Island, Peter Gunn and Bewitched. He frequently collaborated on scripts with his brother Frank.

Personal life
He was married to actress and singer Fay McKenzie. He died in 1985 aged 63 of cancer.

External links
 
 
 

1922 births
1985 deaths
Screenwriters from Illinois
Male actors from Chicago
20th-century American screenwriters